During the 2005–06 English football season, Sheffield United competed in the Football League Championship.

Season summary
The 2005–06 season was Sheffield United's twelfth straight season at the second level of the English football pyramid – a period longer than any other team currently in the Championship, and their longest spell in any Division since 1934.

After beating Cardiff City 1–0 on Good Friday and never being outside of the top two places all season, the Blades required only one point from their final three games to secure their promotion. A day later, however, Leeds United failed to beat Reading at Elland Road, which saw Sheffield United promoted back to the Premiership after many disappointments in the previous few seasons.

Kit
United's kit was manufactured by French company Le Coq Sportif and sponsored by HFS Loans.

Players

First-team squad
Squad at end of season

Left club during season

}

Reserve squad
The following players did not appear for the first-team this season.

Transfers

In

Summer

Winter

Final league table

Results
Sheffield United's score comes first

Legend

Football League Championship

FA Cup

League Cup

References

Notes

Sheffield United
2005-06